Lon Satton (born Alonzo Louis Lee Staton; February 11, 1927 – October 30, 2020) was an American singer and actor based in the United Kingdom. He is widely known for originating the role of Poppa in the Andrew Lloyd Webber's musical Starlight Express, for which Satton received a 1984 Olivier Award nomination for Best Actor in a Musical. He is sometimes credited as Lonnie Sattin.

Early life 
One of nine children, Satton was born in Jacksonville, Florida, in 1927, the son of Church of God in Christ minister C. T. Staton. His family moved to Philadelphia at an early age. Satton attended Temple University, and initially considered following in his father's footsteps as an evangelist, but developed an interest in entertainment after winning a singing contest.

Career 
As a singer, Satton performed in many jazz clubs, and for a time was a vocalist under Earl Hines and the Cotton Club Revue. In Chicago, he joined a theatre troupe that saw him begin a career in Off-Broadway and Broadway theatre. He starred opposite Barbara McNair in the 1958 musical The Body Beautiful. He also recorded several records for Capitol Records.

Satton made his film debut with an uncredited part in the B-movie The Human Duplicators (1965). He was the second actor to play Lt. Jack Neal on the soap opera One Life to Live. In the early 1970s, he relocated to the United Kingdom. He played a supporting role as a CIA agent in the James Bond film Live and Let Die (1973).

In 1971, he acted in Emil Dean Zoghby and Ray Pohlman's musical Catch My Soul, at the Prince of Wales Theatre in London with Lance LeGault and Sylvia McNeill. The following year, Satton acted in The Threepenny Opera, at the same venue. In 1977, he acted in Loften Mitchell's musical Bubbling Brown Sugar in London.

Arguably his best known role was as Ramblin' Poppa McCoy in Andrew Lloyd Webber's musical Starlight Express, which satton continuously played from the show's opening in 1984 until 1996. His performance earned him an Olivier Award nomination for an Best Actor in a Musical.

Personal life 
Satton had two children with his wife, actress Tina Sattin. His cousin was jazz singer Dakota Staton.

Filmography

Film 
1968: For Love of Ivy - Harry
1970: The Invincible Six - Mike
1970: Hello-Goodbye - Cole Strutter
1971: Welcome to the Club - Marshall Bowles
1972: Steptoe and Son - Pianist
1973: Live and Let Die - Harold Strutter
1978: Revenge of the Pink Panther - Sam Spade and the Private Eyes #1
1990: The March - Jack Harris

Television 
1969: One Life to Live - Lieutenant Jack Neal
1975: Space 1999 - Benjamin Ouma (1 episode)
1975: Quiller - Jim Lane (2 episodes)
1994: The Lenny Henry Show - Chief of police (1 episode)

References

External links
 *

1929 births
2020 deaths
African-American male actors
African-American male singers
American expatriate male actors in the United Kingdom
American male film actors
American male musical theatre actors
American male stage actors
American male television actors
Church of God in Christ
Male actors from Jacksonville, Florida
Male actors from Philadelphia
Musicians from Jacksonville, Florida
Musicians from Philadelphia
Temple University alumni